Jewett is a city in Leon County, Texas, United States. The population was 1,167 at the 2010 census. It was laid out in 1871 by the International Railroad Company.

Geography

Jewett is located at  (31.362119, –96.144630).

Demographics

At the 2000 census there were 861 people in 333 households, including 223 families, in the city. The population density was 418.4 people per square mile (161.4/km). There were 399 housing units at an average density of 193.9 per square mile (74.8/km). The racial makeup of the city was 75.15% White, 7.67% African American, 14.87% from other races, and 2.32% from two or more races. Hispanic or Latino of any race were 23.58%.

Of the 333 households, 38.1% had children under the age of 18 living with them, 47.1% were married couples living together, 14.4% had a female householder with no husband present, and 33.0% were non-families. 30.0% of households were one person and 14.4% were one person aged 65 or older. The average household size was 2.59 and the average family size was 3.22.

The age distribution was 31.6% under the age of 18, 10.1% from 18 to 24, 27.4% from 25 to 44, 18.7% from 45 to 64, and 12.2% 65 or older. The median age was 31 years. For every 100 females, there were 94.8 males. For every 100 females age 18 and over, there were 87.6 males.

The median household income was $26,250 and the median family income was $33,500. Males had a median income of $31,667 versus $20,347 for females. The per capita income for the city was $17,469. About 21.4% of families and 26.4% of the population were below the poverty line, including 29.7% of those under age 18 and 21.0% of those age 65 or over.

Education
Jewett is served by the Leon Independent School District.

Notable people

 Alger "Texas" Alexander, blues singer; born in Jewett
 Romus Burgin, U.S. Marine and author; born in Jewett
 Fritz Von Erich, professional wrestler; born in Jewett

Gallery

Climate
The climate in this area is characterized by hot, humid summers and generally mild to cool winters. According to the Köppen Climate Classification system, Jewett has a humid subtropical climate, abbreviated "Cfa" on climate maps.

References

External links
 

Cities in Texas
Cities in Leon County, Texas